Pianoro is a railway station in Pianoro, Italy. The station opened in 1934 and is located on the Bologna–Florence railway. Train services are operated by Trenitalia Tper.

The station is managed by Rete Ferroviaria Italiana (RFI), a subsidiary of Ferrovie dello Stato Italiane (FSI), Italy's state-owned rail company.

History
The station opened in 1934, when the railway line itself was inaugurated.

Features
The station consists of four tracks.

Train services

The station is served by the following service(s):

 Suburban services (Treno suburbano) on line S1B, Bologna - San Benedetto Val di Sambro

See also

 List of railway stations in Emilia-Romagna
 Bologna metropolitan railway service

References 

Railway stations in Emilia-Romagna
Railway stations opened in 1934